Tram Iv Tek (30 November 1948 – 1 June 2021) was the Minister of Posts and Telecommunications of Cambodia. 

He belonged to the Cambodian People's Party and was elected to represent Kampong Chhnang Province in the National Assembly of Cambodia in 2003. Between 2008 and 2016, he served as the Minister of Public Works and Transport of the government of Cambodia.

References

1948 births 
2021 deaths 
Members of the National Assembly (Cambodia)
Cambodian People's Party politicians
Government ministers of Cambodia
People from Kampong Chhnang province